Bunazosin (INN) is an α1-adrenergic receptor antagonist. Bunazosin was initially developed to treat benign prostatic hyperplasia (BPH). It has been approved in Japan in a topical form to treat glaucoma. The mechanism of action is a reduction of aqueous outflow through the uveoscleral pathway resulting in lowering the intraocular pressure. It also may act to improve blood flow to the ocular nerve. Systemic Alpha-1 adrenergic receptor antagonists have been implicated in Intraoperative Floppy Iris Syndrome (IFIS). Bunazosin potentially could have the same effect but there has been no research to substantiate this as a risk for cataract surgery.

References

Alpha blockers
Carboxamides
Catechol ethers
Diazepanes
Quinazolines